Leavenworth may refer to:

Geography
Leavenworth, Indiana
Leavenworth, Minnesota
Leavenworth, a neighborhood of Omaha, Nebraska
Leavenworth, Washington
Leavenworth County, Kansas, a county in northeast Kansas
Leavenworth, Kansas, a city in the county which includes the fort and federal prisons within its city limits
Roman Catholic Diocese of Leavenworth

Institutions and structures
Fort Leavenworth, a U.S. Army base in Leavenworth, Kansas
Fort Leavenworth National Cemetery, a cemetery on the base
Midwest Joint Regional Correctional Facility, often referred to as Leavenworth, a military prison built on the grounds of Fort Leavenworth
United States Penitentiary, Leavenworth, often referred to as Leavenworth, a civilian medium security prison built on the grounds of Fort Leavenworth
United States Disciplinary Barracks, often referred to as Leavenworth, a military maximum security prison built on the grounds of Fort Leavenworth

People
 Henry Leavenworth, U.S. soldier who established Fort Leavenworth
 Jesse Henry Leavenworth, U.S. soldier, son of Henry Leavenworth